Prayer is considered to be an integral part of the Hindu religion; it is practiced during Hindu worship (puja) and is an expression of devotion (bhakti). The chanting of mantras is the most popular form of worship in Hinduism. Yoga and meditation are also considered as a form of devotional service.

In Hinduism, there are three path or ways for the worship of God: Karma yoga, Jnana yoga, and Bhakti yoga. In Karma, it is all about our karma, actions, intentions,
intuitions, motives and reactions. In Dnyan Yoga, Abhyas, Shastra charcha, Dnyan Upasana is more important. And in Bhakti Yoga, there are many simple and religious ways to do upasana of God, such as Stuti, Mantra Gan, Ved Pathan, Kurti pujan, Advait Upasana, and meditation.

The Vedas are a collection of liturgy (mantras, hymns). Stuti is a general term for devotional literary compositions, but literally means praise. 

The Hindu devotional Bhakti movements emphasises repetitive prayer, called japa. Stemming from the universal Soul or Brahman, prayer is focused on the personal forms of Devas and/or Devis, such as Vishnu, or Vishnu's Avatars, Rama and Krishna, Shiva or Shiva's sons such as Karthik and Ganesh as well as Shakti, or Shakti's forms such as Lakshmi or Kali. Ganesha is also a popular deity in bhakti.

Before the process of ritual, before the invoking of different deities for the fulfillment of various needs, came the human aspiration to the highest truth, the foundational monism of Hinduism, pertaining ultimately to the one Brahman. Brahman, which summarily can be called the unknowable, true, infinite, and blissful Divine Ground, is the source and being of all existence from which the cosmos springs. This is the essence of the Vedic system. The Gayatri mantra was part and parcel of all the Vedic ceremonies and continues to be invoked even today in Hindu temples all over India and other countries around the world, and exemplifies this essence.

Bhakti yoga 

Described in the Bhagavad Gita, bhakti yoga is the path of love and devotion. On bhakti yoga:

It is essentially the process of enlightenment found through worship of the Devas (or Devi, the feminine form of Deva), in whatever form one envisions. Prayer is achieved through puja (worship) done either at the family shrine or a local temple. We can see from Krishna's injunction that prayer is fundamental to Hinduism, that to dwell constantly on the Divine is key to enlightenment. Prayer repetition (through mantras) using malas (Hindu prayer beads) are a strong part of Hinduism.

The devotionalist Bhakti movement originates in South India in the Early Middle Ages, and by the Late Middle Ages spread throughout the subcontinent, giving rise to Sant Mat and Gaudiya Vaishnavism.

Stemming from Brahman, prayer is focused on many divine manifestations, including primarily Shiva and Vishnu. Some other extremely popular deities are Krishna and Rama (incarnations of Vishnu), Ma Kali (Mother Kali, the feminine deity, or Mother Goddess, aka Durga, Parvati, Shakti, etc.) and Ganesha (the famous elephant-headed God of wisdom). It is epitomised by the devotion of the God Hanuman or Bajrang Bali for his Lord Rama. Another major form of prayer for Hindus involves a heavy focus on meditation, through Hindu yoga that stills the mind in order to focus on God.

Mantras

Gayatri mantra 

The Gayatri mantra is Hinduism's most representative prayer. Many Hindus recite it on a daily basis, not only contemplating its straightforward meaning, but also dwelling on and imbibing its sound, regarded to be pregnant with spiritual meaning. For this reason nearly all Hindu prayers and mantras are sung. The Gayatri mantra was first recorded in the Rigveda which was composed in Sanskrit about 2500 to 3500 years ago, and by some reports, the mantra may have been chanted for many generations before that.

Perspectives 
Mahatma Gandhi stated that:

See also 
 Jangam

Notes

References

Bibliography